The Grotto of Pedra Furada, also known as the Refuge of Pedra Furada, is a limestone cave in the Machado district of Laranjeiras, Sergipe, Brazil. 

The cave has been damaged over time by limestone mining. Limestone removal from the site has ended, but the partial destruction is notable. It remains a site of Catholic and Afro-Brazilian religious celebrations.

The grotto was the site of early Jesuit (Society of Jesus) activities in the region. The Society held mass in the grotto during the Dutch invasion of Brazil. According to local legend, the Jesuits used a tunnel from the Grotto of Pedra Furada to access Church of Our Lady of the Conception of Comandaroba to continue to celebrate mass.

Protected status

The Grotto of Pedra Furada was listed as a protected structure by the state of Sergipe in 1990.

Access

The Grotto of Pedra Furada is located on private land but may be accessed.

References

Caves of Sergipe
Grottoes
State heritage sites of Sergipe
Limestone caves